Andrés Bayron Silva Lemos (born 27 March 1986 in Tacuarembó) is a Uruguayan track athlete. He competed in the combined events on the youth and junior levels, but has since specialized in the 400 metres and 400 metres hurdles.

Silva participated in the 400 metres at the 2004 and 2008 Olympics, and 400 metres hurdles at the 2012 and 2016 Summer Olympics.

He was Uruguay's flagbearer at the 2007 Pan American Games.

He tested positive for 6-oxo-androstene in an out-of-competition test in June 2015 and was banned for a period of six months, which included his missing the 2015 World Championships in Athletics.

Personal bests

Competition record

References

External links

1986 births
Living people
People from Tacuarembó
Uruguayan male sprinters
Uruguayan male hurdlers
Olympic athletes of Uruguay
Athletes (track and field) at the 2004 Summer Olympics
Athletes (track and field) at the 2008 Summer Olympics
Athletes (track and field) at the 2012 Summer Olympics
Athletes (track and field) at the 2016 Summer Olympics
Pan American Games competitors for Uruguay
Athletes (track and field) at the 2007 Pan American Games
Athletes (track and field) at the 2011 Pan American Games
Athletes (track and field) at the 2015 Pan American Games
World Athletics Championships athletes for Uruguay
Doping cases in athletics
Uruguayan sportspeople in doping cases
Athletes (track and field) at the 2018 South American Games
South American Games bronze medalists for Uruguay
South American Games gold medalists for Uruguay
South American Games medalists in athletics
20th-century Uruguayan people
21st-century Uruguayan people